Närcon (formally written as NärCon) is a combined gaming and anime convention which is arranged several times per year in Linköping, Sweden by NärCon Eventbyrå AB. It is the largest event of its kind in Scandinavia. The main event (NärCon Sommar, summer) usually starts at the end of July and offers activities such as board games, card games and roleplaying activities. Additionally, there are rooms dedicated for computer and console gaming. Competitive e-sports tournaments are also arranged.

The Summer 2017 event received 10 000 participants.

History 
NärCon was founded in 2002 by Sam Anlér and was hosted at A-huset and Kulturpalatset in Örebro. The event has been hosted yearly since then.

Nordic Cosplay Championship 
One of NärCon's major events include cosplay competitions. NärCon hosts the Nordic Cosplay Championship every year, the championship, which is co-ordinated by event organizers from Denmark, Finland, Iceland, Norway and Sweden pick winners from each respective cosplay scene. 13 cosplayers then meet at NärCon in order to compete for prizes, one of them being a trip to Japan for two. In 2018, the championship had its first observer nations; Lithuania and Latvia.

See also 
 List of anime conventions

References

External links 
 
  − Nordic Cosplay Championship

Anime conventions
Events in Linköping
Video game conventions
Gaming conventions